John Francis Kirk (7 February 1922 – after 1951) was an English footballer who made 31 appearances in the Football League playing on the wing for  Darlington in the 1950s. He was on the books of Nottingham Forest, but never represented them in the League, and went on to play non-league football for Kidderminster Harriers.

References

1922 births
Year of death missing
Footballers from Leicester
English footballers
Association football wingers
Nottingham Forest F.C. players
Darlington F.C. players
Kidderminster Harriers F.C. players
English Football League players